Mannose 1-phosphate is a molecule involved in glycosylation.

See also
 Congenital disorder of glycosylation
 Mannose-6-phosphate

Organophosphates
Monosaccharide derivatives